Monchegorsk has been a name of the following vessels:

 , a SA-15 type Arctic cargo ship
 , a double acting ship owned by Norilsk Nickel

Ship names